Mildred Gale (1671–1701), born Mildred Warner in the Colony of Virginia, was the paternal grandmother of former president George Washington.

Early life
Mildred was born in 1671, at Warner Hall, the family home in Gloucester County, Virginia, the daughter of Col. Augustine Warner Jr. (1642–1681) and Mildred Reade. Her paternal grandfather was Augustine Warner. Her paternal great-grandparents were Thomas Warner and Elizabeth Sotherton.

Family
The men of Mildred's family took an active part in the local government of colonial Virginia. Her paternal grandfather Augustine Warner was a justice, a Burgess and a member of the council of Gloucester County. Her maternal grandfather Colonel George Reade was also a member of the council. Her father Colonel Augustine Warner Jr. was also a Burgess and Speaker of the House of Burgesses.

She was one of three surviving Warner offspring, all females. The other two were Elizabeth Warner and Mary Warner. All three married and left children and descendants.

First marriage
She married Lawrence Washington (also spelled Laurence Washington) in 1685, a union that produced three children: John Washington, III (1692–1746), Augustine (1694–1743), and Mildred (1698–1747). Augustine would become the father of George Washington. Lawrence died in 1698, bequeathing to Mildred and the children shares in his estate, the profits from which were to be spent on their education.

Second marriage
In 1700, she married George Gale of Whitehaven, England, a prominent merchant who helped forge trade links between Whitehaven, England and Virginia. She settled in Whitehaven and became pregnant. However, she contracted a fever and made her will before the baptism of her child. Mildred died on 30 January 1701. Her will placed care of the Washington children in the hands of George, although this was later challenged in the Virginia courts by Lawrence's cousin John Washington, and their custody passed to him.
Her will left most of the property she had inherited from her late husband to George Gale. John Washington challenged this in court also.

Death
Mildred lies buried in the grounds of St Nicholas's Church in Whitehaven. The exact whereabouts of her grave is unknown, due to several graveyard re-arrangements and a subsequent fire in the church in 1971, but a commemorative plaque is in the garden of the church.

See also
Washington family

References

External links
Mildred Gale Biography
Images of St Nicholas Church and Gardens
ThePeerage.com

1671 births
1701 deaths
People from Gloucester County, Virginia
Washington family